Magnis may refer to:

 Magnis (Carvoran), the form of the name Magnae Carvetiorum (Carvoran) that appears in the Antonine Itinerary
 Magnis (Kenchester), the form of the name Magnae (Kenchester) that appears in the Antonine Itinerary
 Magnis Ridge, rock ridge in Antarctica
 Magnis Valley, ice-free valley in Antarctica

See also
 Magna (disambiguation)
 Magni (disambiguation)